Sandra Marie Lees (born 1985) is a British model and winner of several regional and national beauty pageants. She has represented the UK at the Miss International and Miss Tourism contests. As of September 11, 2010 she also holds the title of Miss Earth England and will compete at the Miss Earth final, one of the top three international beauty pageants, to be held in Vietnam.

Professional career

Acting Background, Introduction to Modelling

Sandra Marie graduated from Birmingham Theatre School in 2006, hoping to forge a career in acting. She entered Miss Limo 2007, and after achieving a runner up spot, began to compete in pageants on a regular basis.

Charity Work
Sandra Marie has promoted and raised money for several charities during her career. These include Walk With Cancer in association with the Miss England pageant, and Help For Heroes for Miss Coventry.

Pageant Achievements
Sandra Marie's introduction to beauty pageants came in 2007, challenging for the title of Miss Limo. She achieved a runner up position, an excellent result for a first competition, made all the more remarkable as she was initially entered by a friend as a practical joke. Her first pageant victory was the title of Miss West Midlands, a heat for the crown of Miss British Isles. In 2008 she began her reign as Miss Coventry and reached the semi-final stage of Miss England. This was followed by success at the Miss Keltruck contest, resulting in her featuring in the 2009 Keltruck calendar. Sandra's win in the Miss Beauty Queen Birmingham competition and subsequent victory at the national contest gave her the title Miss British International and a place in the world final in Chicago, her first appearance at an international pageant.

Sandra's most recent victory is the prestigious title of Miss Earth England, under which she will compete at Miss Earth 2010 in Nha Trang, Vietnam. The pageant is one of the three largest held internationally along with Miss World and Miss Universe.

Pageant Results

References

External links
 http://www.miss-beautyqueen.com/index.php?option=com_content&task=view&id=27&Itemid=35
 http://www.birminghamtheatreschool.co.uk/

1985 births
Living people
People from Birmingham, West Midlands
Miss Earth 2010 contestants
British beauty pageant winners